Saibai is a town within the locality of  Saibai Island in the Torres Strait Island Region, Queensland, Australia.

History 
Kala Kawaw Ya (also known as Kalaw Kawaw, KKY) is one of the languages of the Torres Strait. Kala Kawaw Ya is the traditional language owned by the Top Western islands of the Torres Strait. The Kala Kawaw Ya language region includes the landscape within the local government boundaries of the Torres Shire Council.

It is believed that there was a school on island since about 1900. It was possibly a mission school during the 1930s.

On 29 January 1985, Saibai Island State School opened. In 2007 it became that Saibai Island campus of the Tagai State School which operates in numerous island in the Torres Strait.

References 

Torres Strait Island Region
Towns in Queensland